Acrocercops ochnifolii is a moth of the family Gracillariidae. It is known from South Africa.

The larvae feed on Ochna natalitia. They mine the leaves of their host plant. The mine has the form of a moderate, irregularly oblong, pale ochreous, transparent blotch-mine, with epidermal parts along the margin.

References

Endemic moths of South Africa
ochnifolii
Moths of Africa
Moths described in 1961